U výčepu is a Czech comedy play performed in Czech sign language.

Cast

Theatre Čertovka, Prague 
Directed by Jaroslav Dušek. The play is acts in a deaf actors and actresses.
Naďa Dingová
Roman Vránek
Kateřina Červinková-Houšková
Fedor Krajčík
Jiří Procházka
Zuzana Hájková
Jaroslav Milich
Jaroslav Dušek

References

External links 
About play U výčepu
Kultura a společnost

Comedy plays
Czech plays